The following is a list of events affecting Canadian television in 2017. Events listed include television show debuts, finales, cancellations, and channel launches, closures and rebrandings.

Events

Notable events

February

March

July

August

September

October

December

Television programs

Programs debuting in 2017
Series currently listed here have been announced by their respective networks as scheduled to premiere in 2017. Note that shows may be delayed or cancelled by the network between now and their scheduled air dates.

Television films and specials

Television stations

Stations closures

See also
 2017 in Canada
 List of Canadian films of 2017

References